Azenia obtusa, the obtuse yellow moth, is a moth of the family Noctuidae. The species was first described by Gottlieb August Wilhelm Herrich-Schäffer in 1854. It is found in North America from southern Ontario and New York to Florida and west to Texas and Missouri.

The wingspan is 18–25 mm. Adults have light yellow forewings with three large violet-brown costal spots and usually two small ones. The hindwings are paler yellow with one to three slightly darker lines. They are on wing from June to August.

The larvae feed on Ambrosia trifida.

References

Moths described in 1854
Acronictinae
Moths of North America